Oakley Hill is a   nature reserve south of Chinnor  in Oxfordshire, England. It is managed by the Berkshire, Buckinghamshire and Oxfordshire Wildlife Trust.

This hill has chalk grassland, beech woodland and scrub. Flowering plants include Chiltern gentian, wild thyme, clustered bellflower, pyramidal orchid, yellow-wort, dog's mercury, bluebell, common rock-rose and harebell.

References

Berkshire, Buckinghamshire and Oxfordshire Wildlife Trust